Bleckley County is a county located in the central portion of the U.S. state of Georgia. As of the 2020 census, the population was 12,583. The county seat is Cochran.

History 
The county was named for Logan Edwin Bleckley, a soldier and Justice of the Supreme Court of Georgia. The state constitutional amendment to create the county was proposed  by the Georgia General Assembly on July 30, 1912, and ratified November 5, 1912. Bleckley County was formerly home to Middle Georgia College, the oldest two-year public college in the nation. In 2013 it merged with Macon State College to become Middle Georgia State University.

Bleckley County High School made news in March 2010 for allowing a same-sex couple to attend its senior prom, after another same-sex couple in Mississippi were denied attendance at another senior prom.

Government 
Bleckley County is one of eight remaining counties in Georgia that operates under a sole commissioner form of government, with a single county commissioner acting as the county executive and legislative branches. The current County Commissioner is Mike Davis, the Sheriff is Kris Coody, the Fire Chief is Matt Kelley, the Clerk of Superior Court is Dianne C. Brown, the Tax Commissioner is Paige Baggs, and the Probate Judge is Hon. Jonathan Fordham.

Bleckly County's sole commissioner form of government was discussed in Holder v. Hall, decided by the United States Supreme Court on June 30, 1994.

Geography 
The county is located in the upper Atlantic coastal plain region of the state.

The eastern quarter of Bleckley County, roughly in a line from west of Danville running southeast, is located in the Lower Oconee River sub-basin of the Altamaha River basin. The central quarter of the county, between Cochran and the previous line, is located in the Little Ocmulgee River sub-basin of the same Altamaha River basin. The western half of the county, west of Cochran, is located in the Lower Ocmulgee River sub-basin of the same larger Altamaha River basin.

Major highways 

  Interstate 16
  U.S. Route 23
 U.S. Route 23 Business
 U.S. Route 129 Alternate
  State Route 26
  State Route 87
  State Route 87 Business
  State Route 112
  State Route 126
  State Route 257
  State Route 278
  State Route 404 (unsigned designation of I-16)

Adjacent counties
 Wilkinson County - north
 Twiggs County - north
 Laurens County - east
 Dodge County - southeast
 Pulaski County - southwest
 Houston County - west

Demographics

2000 census
As of the census of 2000, there were 11,666 people, 4,372 households, and 3,121 families living in the county.  The population density was 54 people per square mile (21/km2).  There were 4,866 housing units at an average density of 22 per square mile (9/km2).  The racial makeup of the county was 73.24% White, 24.59% Black or African American, 0.09% Native American, 0.93% Asian, 0.03% Pacific Islander, 0.48% from other races, and 0.63% from two or more races.  0.92% of the population were Hispanic or Latino of any race.

There were 4,372 households, out of which 32.90% had children under the age of 18 living with them, 51.80% were married couples living together, 15.50% had a female householder with no husband present, and 28.60% were non-families. 25.50% of all households were made up of individuals, and 11.00% had someone living alone who was 65 years of age or older.  The average household size was 2.52 and the average family size was 3.02.

In the county, the population was spread out, with 26.60% under the age of 18, 11.30% from 18 to 24, 26.50% from 25 to 44, 22.10% from 45 to 64, and 13.60% who were 65 years of age or older.  The median age was 35 years. For every 100 females there were 93.00 males.  For every 100 females age 18 and over, there were 88.50 males.

The median income for a household in the county was $33,448, and the median income for a family was $41,095. Males had a median income of $30,917 versus $22,912 for females. The per capita income for the county was $15,934.  About 11.70% of families and 15.90% of the population were below the poverty line, including 24.10% of those under age 18 and 17.80% of those age 65 or over.

2010 census
As of the 2010 United States Census, there were 13,063 people, 4,660 households, and 3,248 families living in the county. The racial makeup of the county was 70.1% white, 27.3% black or African American, 0.8% Asian, 0.1% American Indian, 0.7% from other races, and 1.0% from two or more races. Those of Hispanic or Latino origin made up 2.3% of the population. In terms of ancestry, 14.8% were American, 7.9% were English, and 6.3% were Irish.

Of the 4,660 households, 33.2% had children under the age of 18 living with them, 49.7% were married couples living together, 15.5% had a female householder with no husband present, 30.3% were non-families, and 26.5% of all households were made up of individuals. The average household size was 2.49 and the average family size was 2.99. The median age was 35.9 years.

The median income for a household in the county was $35,661 and the median income for a family was $48,750. Males had a median income of $36,697 versus $26,691 for females. The per capita income for the county was $18,960. About 18.0% of families and 19.5% of the population were below the poverty line, including 29.1% of those under age 18 and 13.4% of those age 65 or over.

2020 census

As of the 2020 United States census, there were 12,583 people, 4,176 households, and 2,727 families residing in the county.

Education

Communities

Cities
 Allentown
 Cochran

Unincorporated communities
 Cary
 Empire
 Baileys Park
 Brown Hill
 Coley Station
 Five Points
 Fraizer
 Goldsboro
 Paulk
 Porter
 Powell
 Rebie
 Royal

Points of interest 

Cochran-Bleckley Cotton & Peanut Museum
Cochran Motor Speedway
Middle Georgia Equestrian Center
Ocmulgee Public Fishing Area
Ocmulgee Water Trail
Ocmulgee Wildlife Management Area
Terry L. Coleman Museum and Archives

See also

 National Register of Historic Places listings in Bleckley County, Georgia
List of counties in Georgia

References

External links
 Cochran-Bleckley Chamber of Commerce
 Bleckley County historical marker

 
1912 establishments in Georgia (U.S. state)
Georgia (U.S. state) counties
Populated places established in 1912